Richard Slater (25 November 1634 – 17 August 1699) was an English politician.

He was born the eldest son of Anthony Slater, a grocer of Cheapside, London and Stainsby, Stainton, Yorkshire and entered Lincoln's Inn in 1651.

He was appointed High Sheriff of Nottinghamshire for 1676–77. He was the Member of Parliament (MP) for Nottingham from 1679 to 1685 and again from 1690 to 1699.

He died aged 64. He had married Elizabeth, with whom he had three daughters.

References

1634 births
1699 deaths
Politicians from Nottingham
High Sheriffs of Nottinghamshire
English MPs 1679
English MPs 1680–1681
English MPs 1690–1695
English MPs 1695–1698
English MPs 1698–1700